Motown is an American record label founded in 1959.

Motown can also refer to:

Related to the Motown label
 de Passe Entertainment, a film and television production company known from 1968 to 2008 as Motown Productions
 Motown Software (also known as Motown Games), a mid-90s video game publisher
 Motown Museum, a museum located in the former music studio known as Hitsville U.S.A.
 Motown (music style), named after the label

Music
 Motown: The Musical, a 2013 jukebox musical
 Motown (album), a 2003 album by Michael McDonald
 Motown Two, a 2004 follow-up album by Michael McDonald
 Motown Remixed, a 2005 compilation album
 Motown: A Journey Through Hitsville USA, a 2007 album by Boyz II Men
 "The Motown Song", a 1991 single by Rod Stewart

Other
 A nickname for the city of Detroit
 Motown Motion Picture Studios, a movie studio